Snack Attack is a 1981 maze action video game.

Snack Attack may also refer to:

 Snack Attack (FIRST), a challenge theme for Food Factor
 Snack Attack II, a 1982 Pac-Man-inspired maze game
 Ismism, a 1981 album by Godley & Creme released in the US under the name Snack Attack

See also
 Stack Attack
 Shakatak